Bangka Lungshan Temple (also Lungshan Temple of Manka, Mengjia Longshan Temple) is a Chinese folk religious temple in Wanhua District (alternately known as Bangka/Mengjia), Taipei, Taiwan. The temple was built in Taipei in 1738 by settlers from Fujian during Qing rule in honor of Guanyin. It served as a place of worship and a gathering place for the Chinese settlers. In addition to its Buddhist elements, it includes halls and altars to Chinese deities such as Mazu and Guan Yu.

History

The temple has been destroyed either in full or in part in numerous earthquakes and fires but Taipei residents have consistently rebuilt and renovated it. The temple was rebuilt during Japanese rule. Most recently, it was hit by American bombers during the Taihoku Air Raid on May 31, 1945, during World War II because the Japanese were reportedly hiding armaments there. The main building and the left corridor were damaged and many precious artifacts and artworks were lost. It was rebuilt after the end of World War II a few months later.

Gallery of Images

Transportation
The temple is accessible within walking distance North from Longshan Temple Station of the Taipei Metro.

See also

Bangka Park
Bangka Qingshui Temple, Wanhua District
Dalongdong Baoan Temple, Datong District
Xingtian Temple, Zhongshan District
Ciyou Temple, Songshan District
Guandu Temple, Beitou District
Lukang Longshan Temple, Changhua County
Fengshan Longshan Temple, Kaohsiung
List of temples in Taiwan

References

External links

 The Lungshan Temple website
 
Longshan Monastery, Architectura Sinica Site Archive

1738 establishments in Taiwan
Religious buildings and structures completed in 1738
Buddhist temples in Taipei
National monuments of Taiwan